The Sri Lanka cricket team toured Australia in February 2017 to play three Twenty20 International (T20Is) matches. Cricket Australia confirmed the venues in August 2016 with the tour starting in Melbourne, before heading to the first-ever international cricket match to be held at Kardinia Park, Geelong with the final T20 to be held at Adelaide Oval. With both Steve Smith and David Warner unavailable due to the scheduling of the series against India, Aaron Finch was named as Australia's captain for the series. Sri Lanka's T20I captain Angelo Mathews was unavailable for the tour, after suffering a hamstring injury during the second T20I against South Africa in January 2017.

Ahead of the T20I series, there was a twenty-over tour match between Prime Minister's XI and Sri Lanka. Adam Voges captained the Prime Minister's XI side in his last international match before he retired. In the T20I series, Sri Lanka won the three-match T20I series 2–1.

Squads

Australia's Chris Lynn was injured prior to the series and was replaced by Ben Dunk.

Tour match

20-over match: Prime Minister's XI v Sri Lanka

T20I series

1st T20I

2nd T20I

3rd T20I

References

External links
 Series home at ESPN Cricinfo

2017 in Australian cricket
2017 in Sri Lankan cricket
International cricket competitions in 2016–17
Sri Lankan cricket tours of Australia